Daniel A. Vallero is an American environmental author and scientist. He was born in East St. Louis, Illinois and grew up in Collinsville, Illinois. He received a bachelor's degree and a master's degree in city and regional planning from Southern Illinois University-Edwardsville.  He also earned a masters in civil and environmental engineering (environmental health sciences) from the University of Kansas and a PhD in civil and environmental engineering from Duke University with a thesis on "“Dicarboximide Fungicide Flux to the Lower Troposphere from an Aquic Hapludult Soil”

Career 

Vallero is recognized internationally for advancing the state of environmental science and engineering, as an author, educator, engineer and scientific researcher. He has appeared on news and other shows, recently discussing plastic recycling on NBC's Today Show (http://www.today.com/video/today/51620316) and on MSNBC, and current state of ethics in research at universities. He began his professional career in the Kansas City regional office of the U.S. Environmental Protection Agency in 1976 and has worked in numerous other scientific venues since then. He directed the Science, Technology and Human Values Program at Duke University from 1997 to 2005. Beginning in 2005, he has been  adjunct Professor of  Engineering Ethics at  Duke University, with a joint appointment in the Department of Civil and Environmental Engineering, and  the Trinity School of Arts and Sciences. He held appointments also at the University of Missouri-Kansas City, North Carolina Central University, and as science staff member on Energy and Power Subcommittee of the United States House of Representatives.
 
In his books and other writings, Vallero has taken the systems view of science and engineering as they related to life at every scale from molecular to planetary. As such he has bridged biomedical engineering with environmental engineering. He stresses the need to incorporate the social sciences into every engineering and design project.  As a leader in engineering ethics, he has served the National Academy of Engineering as a member of the Online Ethics Committee and the Executive Board of the National Institute of Engineering Ethics. Vallero has also advised Sigma Xi, universities and other institutions on science and research ethics and the responsible conduct of research (RCR).

Vallero is editor for the Institution of Chemical Engineers' journal, Process Safety and Environmental Protection, as well as the MDPI journal, Sustainability. He is also the environmental engineering subject editor of the McGraw-Hill Encyclopedia of Science & Technology and the McGraw-Hill Yearbook of Science & Technology.

Works 

Vallero is a pioneer of green engineering and the application of life cycle analysis to engineering design. He was among the first to question the sustainability and ethics of using corn as a source of ethanol fuel. His reasoning was that current farming practice's dependence on fossil fuels needed to grow (including fertilizer and pesticides), harvest and ferment the corn is highly inefficient thermodynamically. The use of corn for fuel is especially problematic, since only the seed are used, not to mention the misuse of an important part of the global food supply. Vallero argued that other crops are much more sustainable, especially those that make use of the whole plant, including cellulosic material, like switchgrass (Panicum virgatum).

In the book, "DUST: The inside Story of its Role in the September 11th Aftermath,"  the late American scientist Paul Lioy credited Vallero with leading the way to sampling of hazardous air pollutants in and around Ground Zero following the 9/11 attacks on the World Trade Center. Lioy collaborated with Vallero in establishing a protocol for characterizing exposure in risk assessments following such emergencies. Lioy and Vallero coined the term “5 R’s” to delineate how exposure assessment varies during the five stages following a disaster: 1. Rescue; 2. Recovery; 3. Reentry; 4. Restoration; and 5. Rehabitation.

With architect, Chris Brasier, Vallero coined the term "synthovation," as a new design process for green engineering and green architecture. A combination of synthesis and innovation, sustainable design does not consider innovation to be an interruption (feedback loop) to the design process as in traditional "concept to completion" design. Rather, innovations are to be expected and integrated. Differing from the traditional step-wise process, synthovation is a spiral, dynamic, and continuously moving process toward completion of the design and throughout the life of the project, including end-of life recycling and design for disassembly, a component of design for environment (DfE), with innovations added along the way that will increase the sustainability of the project over its entire life cycle.

In her book, "Hormone Deception", Lindsey Berkson credits Vallero as among the first to apply exposure science to endocrine disruptors.

Books 
Vallero, D.A. (2021). Environmental Systems Science: Theory and Practical Applications, 1st Edition. Academic Press, Amsterdam, Netherlands and Boston MA, Print Book  704 pages.
Yadav, D., Kumar, P. Singh, P. and Vallero, D.A.  Editors (2021). Hazardous Waste Management: An Overview of Advanced and Cost-Effective Solutions. 1st Edition. Academic Press, Amsterdam, Netherlands and Boston MA, Print Book  312 pages.
Vallero, D.A. (2019). Air Pollution Calculations, 1st Edition. Academic Press, Amsterdam, Netherlands and Boston MA, Print Book  312 pages. 
Letcher, T.M. and Vallero, D.A.  Editors (2019). Waste: A Handbook for Management. 2nd Edition. Academic Press, Amsterdam, Netherlands and Boston MA, Print Book  804 pages.
Vallero, D.A. (2017). Translating Diverse Environmental Data into Reliable Information:How to Coordinate Evidence from Different Sources. 1st Edition. Academic Press, Amsterdam, Netherlands and Boston MA, Print Book  790 pages.
Vallero, D.A. (2015). Environmental Biotechnology: A Biosystems Approach. 2nd Edition. Academic Press, Amsterdam, Netherlands and Boston MA, Print Book ; eBook . 746 pages.
Vallero, D.A. (2014). Fundamentals of Air Pollution, 5th Edition. Academic Press, Amsterdam, Netherlands and Boston MA,  950 pages. 
Vallero, D.A. and Letcher, T.M. (2012). Unraveling Environmental Disasters. Academic Press, Amsterdam, Netherlands and Boston MA, . 492 pages. Winner of the American Library Association's Choice Outstanding Academic Titles Award. According to WorldCat, the book is held in  465  libraries  
Letcher, T.M. and Vallero, D.A.  Editors (2011). Waste: A Handbook for Management Academic Press, Amsterdam, Netherlands and Boston MA, . 448 pages. According to WorldCat, the book is held in  331  libraries   
Vallero, D.A. (2010). Environmental Biotechnology: A Biosystems Approach. Academic Press, Amsterdam, Netherlands and Boston MA, .750 pages. According to WorldCat, the book is held in  999  libraries 
Ratner, B.D., Hoffman, A.S., Schoen, F.J., Lemons, J.E., Dyro, J. Martinsen, O.G., Kyle, R., Preim, B., Batz, D., Grimnes, S., Vallero, D., Semmlow, J., Murry, W.B., Perez, R. and Bankman, I. (2009). Biomedical Engineering Desk Reference. Academic Press, Amsterdam, Netherlands and Boston MA, . 948 pages.
Vallero, D.A. and Brasier, C. (2008), Sustainable Design: The Science of Sustainability and Green Engineering. John Wiley and Sons, Inc., Hoboken, NJ, . 350 pages. According to WorldCat, the book is held in  454  libraries  
Reviewed by R.W. Peters in Environmental Progress Nov 8, 2008, v27 issue4,  http://onlinelibrary.wiley.com/doi/10.1002/ep.10323/full
Reviewed by D.A. Vaccari  in Choice  Oct 2008 v46 i2 p334(1) 
Reviewed by Amy Trendler in  Library Journal Sept 1, 2008 v133 i14 p126(1)
Reviewed by Alanna Malone in GreenSource: The Magazine of Sustainable Design Aug 8, 2007, http://greensource.construction.com/bookreviews/0807_SustainableDesign.asp
Vallero, D.A. (2007). Fundamentals of Air Pollution, 4th Edition. Academic Press, Amsterdam, Netherlands and Boston MA, . 400 pages. In 1868 libraries according to WorldCat
Reviewed by Don MacKay. Environmental Reviews 2008 v16 p181(1) 
Vallero, D.A., (2007). Biomedical Ethics for Engineers: Ethics and Decision Making in Biomedical and Biosystem Engineering. Academic Press, Amsterdam, Netherlands and Boston MA, . 400 pages. In 1118 libraries according to  WorldCat
Vallero, D.A. and Vesilind, P.A.(2006). Socially Responsible Engineering. John Wiley and Sons, Inc., Hoboken, NJ, . 384 pages. According to WorldCat, the book is held in 254 libraries.  
Reviewed by Ray Bert.  Civil Engineering Nov 2006 v76 i11 p71 
Reviewed by Alex A. Karner, Science and Engineering Ethics 2010 16(2): 415-417 
Vallero, D.A. (2005). Paradigms Lost: Learning from Environmental Mistakes, Mishaps and Misdeeds. Elsevier Butterworth-Heinemann, Amsterdam, Netherlands and Boston MA, . 688 pages. According to WorldCat, the book is held in 1153 libraries. 
Reviewed by Ray Bert.  Civil Engineering March 2006 v76 i3 p68 
Vallero, D.A. (2004). Environmental Contaminants: Assessment and Control. Academic Press, New York, NY, . 832 pages. According to WorldCat, the book is held in 1153 libraries. 
Vallero, D.A. (2003). Engineering the Risks of Hazardous Wastes. Butterworth-Heinemann, Amsterdam, Netherlands and Boston MA, . 306 pages (with contribution by J.J. Peirce). According to WorldCat, the book is held in  999  libraries

References

External links 

Civil Engineering Faculty Website at Duke University
ResearchGate
Center for Computational Toxicology & Exposure at the U.S. EPA
Online Ethics of the National Academy of Engineering
National Institute of Engineering Ethics
International Society of Exposure Science
Expocast
Computational Chemodynamics Laboratory

Living people
Environmental engineers
Scientists from Illinois
1953 births
Duke University Pratt School of Engineering alumni